Doctor Mampuru (born 28 August 1992) is a South African association football right-back who among others played for the Premier Soccer League club Mamelodi Sundowns.

References

1992 births
Living people
People from Makhuduthamaga Local Municipality
Sportspeople from Limpopo
Association football defenders
South African soccer players
Mamelodi Sundowns F.C. players
Chippa United F.C. players
Mpumalanga Black Aces F.C. players
South African Premier Division players